Statistics of Kuwaiti Premier League for the 1992–93 season.

Overview
It was contested by 8 teams, and Al Arabi Kuwait won the championship.

League standings

References
Kuwait - List of final tables (RSSSF)

1993
Kuw
1